Navya Singh is an Indian actress, model, and dancer.

Early life 
Navya Singh was born in a conservative Sikh family in Lakshmipur, a village in Katihar District, Bihar. She experienced gender dysphoria as a boy, and began presenting herself as female when she was a teenager. She moved to Mumbai in 2011, and changed her first name to Navya. After a brief period of living with a relative who did not support her gender identity, she moved within Mumbai and started working as a dancer. When she decided to go through sex reassignment surgery, her mother travelled to Mumbai in order to support her through the process.

Career

Acting and dancing
Before becoming a model, she worked as a dancer in films and television serials. In 2017, she appeared on television in the crime show Savdhaan India on Life OK Channel, and in the music video Shiver by Monica Dogra. 

In the 2021 movie Pledge To Protect, she performed a dance number. 

She has criticised the Indian film industry for casting cisgender actors as transgender people, for not casting transgender men and women as male and female roles, and for the portrayals of transgender individuals in Bollywood movies, describing such characters as "...objects of ridicule, or lust not love".

Modelling
Her first appearance as a model was at the Lakme Fashion Week in 2016, where she was the only trans woman who participated. She has modelled clothes designed by Wendell Rodricks and Archana Kochhar.

In 2018, she was the brand ambassador of Miss Transqueen India, a beauty pageant for trans women.

Awards 
 Winner of Jury Award at 10th Newsmakers Achievers’ Awards

Filmography

Films

Music videos

Television

References

External links 

Indian film actresses
1989 births
Living people
People from Bihar
Transgender female models
Transgender actresses
Indian LGBT actors